Perigee Aerospace is a private developer and manufacturer of orbital and sub-orbital launch vehicles located in Daejeon, South Korea. The company was formally established in 2018, but work began in 2012, initially with the launch of sounding rockets.

, Perigee Aerospace employed 30 people. It develops the small orbital rocket Blue Whale 1. As of 2019, the company also planned to develop a larger rocket.

Vehicles

Blue Whale 1 

The two-stage Blue Whale 1 is planned to become the smallest orbital rocket in the world with a mass of only 1790 kg. Launching from a pad owned by Southern Launch at Whalers Way in South Australia, it can deliver up to 50 kg to a sun-synchronous orbit with an altitude of 500 km. The maiden flight was planned for July 2020 but has been delayed several times. Perigee Aerospace hopes to build the capacity to launch up to 40 Blue Whale 1 rockets per year at a price of US$2 million. As of November 2021, the maiden flight of Blue Whale 1 is expected to take place in 2022.

Sounding Rockets 
Started in 2012, Perigee Aerospace began by developing and launching numerous sounding rockets for meteorological research for the Korean government. In 2018 and 2019 the company received two rounds of venture capital backing from some of South Korea's leading technology investors including Samsung Venture Investments and LB Investment (a subsidiary of LG) to support the development of Blue Whale.The company is also supported by KAIST, South Korea's top technical research institution.     

According to an interview posted on the website of Expedition College in March 2020, an educational program by Dong-A Science, Perigee Aerospace was planning to launch a suborbital sounding rocket developed in collaboration with KAIST. This sounding rocket, designated Blue Whale 0.1, was launched on 29 December 2021 in order to validate the engines of the Blue Whale 1 rocket. The flight was terminated shortly after takeoff due to unexpectedly strong winds. 

Third flight of Blue Whale 0.1 took place 24 March 2022 from Jeju Island. It was suborbital flight test and it was successful.

See also

Links 

 Official website Perigee Aerospace

References 

Private spaceflight companies
Aerospace companies of South Korea
South Korean brands